Pentacalia millei is a species of flowering plant in the family Asteraceae. It is found in Ecuador and Peru. Its natural habitats are subtropical or tropical moist montane forests and subtropical or tropical high-altitude grassland. It is threatened by habitat loss.

References

millei
Flora of Ecuador
Vulnerable plants
Taxonomy articles created by Polbot

Flora of Peru